St. John's Red Storm fencing represents the St. John's University in collegiate fencing. The Red Storm compete as an independent school of NCAA Division I.

Notable former fencers
Notable alumni include:
Keeth Smart - 3x Olympic fencer (2000, 2004, 2008), Silver medalist (2008)
Ivan Lee - Olympic fencer (2004)
Daryl Homer - Olympic fencer (2012)
Dagmara Wozniak - Olympic fencer (2008, 2012)

Individual championships

Year-by-year results

Men's Fencing

Women's Fencing

Coaches

 Sergey Danilov (born 1981), Russian-born American Olympic fencing coach

References 

 

https://redstormsports.com/sports/2018/6/12/sports-c-fenc-archive-stjo-c-fenc-archive-html.aspx